Highway 921 is a provincial highway in the north-west region of the Canadian province of Saskatchewan. It runs from Highway 916 to Highway 937 / Highway 939. Highway 921 is about 25 km (16 mi) long.

See also 
Roads in Saskatchewan
Transportation in Saskatchewan

References 

921